Futures may mean:

Finance
Futures contract, a tradable financial derivatives contract
Futures exchange, a financial market where futures contracts are traded
Futures (magazine), an American finance magazine

Music
Futures (album), a 2004 album released by Jimmy Eat World
"Futures" (song), a single from the above album
Futures (band), a London-based rock band

Social sciences
Futures studies, multidisciplinary studies of patterns to determine the likelihood of future trends
Futures (journal), an academic journal covering futures studies

Sports
Futures Tour, official developmental golf tour of the Ladies Professional Golf Association (LPGA)
Futures tennis tournaments

Other
Futures and promises, high-level synchronization mechanisms (programming objects that act as proxies for results not yet determined)
Futures of American Studies, a summer institute in American Studies at Dartmouth College
Futures, a flash fiction feature in the journal Nature

See also
Future (disambiguation)